Broadway Television Theatre is a one-hour syndicated television anthology series produced by WOR-TV in New York City. The series premiered April 14, 1952 and ran through January 25, 1954.

Overview
Broadway Television Theatre featured a new adaptation of a famous play each week "with a brand-new performance every night of the week". Christopher Plummer, who starred in two episodes, described the performances as "like doing summer stock with cameras".

Production
The shows were performed live on WOR, and kinescope recordings were made for potential syndication to stations in other markets, with limited success.

Warren Wade created the program and was its producer.

Episodes 
Ann Dvorak starred in the title role in the premiere episode, The Trial of Mary Dugan.

The list of shows adapted include:

 Angel Street, written by Patrick Hamilton (writer)
 Craig's Wife, written by George Kelly (playwright)
 Dark Victory 
 The Front Page, written by Ben Hecht and Charles MacArthur Gramercy Ghost, written by John Cecil Holm 
 The Hasty Heart, written by John Patrick (dramatist)
 Janie Kind Lady, written by Edward Chodorov 
 The Last of Mrs. Cheyney, written by Frederick Lonsdale
 The Letter, written by W. Somerset Maugham
 Night Must Fall, written by Emlyn Williams
 Night of January 16th, written by Ayn Rand
 Reflected Glory, written by George Kelly (playwright)
 R.U.R., written by Karel Čapek
 Room Service The Bat by Mary Roberts Rinehart and Avery Hopwood
 The Jazz Singer, written by Samson Raphaelson
 The Thirteenth Chair, written by Bayard Veiller 
 Three Men on a Horse, written by George Abbott
 The Trial of Mary Dugan, written by Bayard Veiller
 Twentieth Century, written by Ben Hecht and Charles MacArthur
 Your Uncle Dudley'', written by Howard Lindsay and Bertrand Robinson

See also
1952–53 United States network television schedule
1953–54 United States network television schedule

References

External links
Broadway Television Theatre at CVTA with episode list

1952 American television series debuts
1954 American television series endings
1950s American anthology television series
Black-and-white American television shows
First-run syndicated television programs in the United States
Television shows filmed in New York City